George Matthew Snelson (22 November 1837 – 31 October 1901) was the first Mayor of Palmerston North and is considered Palmerston North's founding father. He was an ironmonger, a storekeeper and a community leader.

Early life

Snelson was born in Ashby-de-la-Zouch, Leicestershire, England, on 22 November 1837. His parents were James Snelson (coach manufacturer) and Mary (née Halford). He left school when he was 15 to learn the trade of ironmonger and hardware merchant in Melton Mowbray. At age 19, he moved to Bedford for new employment.

He came to New Zealand on 21 February 1863 aboard the Earl of Windsor, arriving in Wellington.

He married Louisa Matilda (née Buck, b. 1844 in Wellington) on 6 July 1865. For a time, he owned the Cluny Park homestead on Rangitikei Line.

Political activity

Mayor of Palmerston North

Snelson was elected mayor seven times. He and his wife are regarded as the father and the mother of Palmerston North. He was the mayor of Palmerston North's first council, elected unopposed on 9 August 1877. The first council had nine members. He served until 1879.

He was again elected in 1883–1884, and then 1889–1892. He died during his seventh term in office in 1901.

On 8 November 1901, the borough councillors elected a new mayor. Two councillors contested the mayoralty, and William Thomas Wood beat Fred Pirani 6 to 4. Councillor Pirani resigned from his seat afterwards on the grounds that he had been misled.

Parliamentary contender

Snelson stood for Parliament in 1879 and 1893, but was unsuccessful on both occasions.

Death

Snelson died at his home in Palmerston North on 31 October 1901, and was buried in Terrace End Cemetery. He was survived by his wife, who died on 15 December 1919 during a visit to Whanganui. Snelson Street in Palmerston North is named after the Snelsons.

References

Mayors of Palmerston North
1837 births
1901 deaths
People from Ashby-de-la-Zouch
English emigrants to New Zealand
Burials at Terrace End Cemetery
Unsuccessful candidates in the 1893 New Zealand general election
Unsuccessful candidates in the 1879 New Zealand general election
19th-century New Zealand politicians